Joel Edwards may refer to:
 Joel Edwards (rugby league), Australian professional rugby league player
 Joel Edwards (Evangelical Alliance), director of Evangelical Alliance
 Joel Edwards (golfer), an American professional golfer
 Joel Edwards (singer), English singer